Biological half-life (also known as elimination half-life, pharmacologic half-life) is the time taken for concentration of a biological substance (such as a medication) to decrease from its maximum concentration (Cmax) to half of Cmax in the blood plasma, and is denoted by the abbreviation . 

This is used to measure the removal of things such as metabolites, drugs, and signalling molecules from the body. Typically, the biological half-life refers to the body's natural cleansing through the function of the liver and through the excretion of the measured substance through the kidneys and intestines. This concept is used when the rate of removal is roughly exponential.

In a medical context, half-life explicitly describes the time it takes for the blood plasma concentration of a substance to halve (plasma half-life) its steady-state when circulating in the full blood of an organism. This measurement is useful in medicine, pharmacology and pharmacokinetics because it helps determine how much of a drug needs to be taken and how frequently it needs to be taken if a certain average amount is needed constantly. By contrast, the stability of a substance in plasma is described as plasma stability. This is essential to ensure accurate analysis of drugs in plasma and for drug discovery.

The relationship between the biological and plasma half-lives of a substance can be complex depending on the substance in question, due to factors including accumulation in tissues, protein binding, active metabolites, and receptor interactions.

Examples

Water
The biological half-life of water in a human is about 7 to 14 days. It can be altered by behavior. Drinking large amounts of alcohol will reduce the biological half-life of water in the body. This has been used to decontaminate humans who are internally contaminated with tritiated water. The basis of this decontamination method is to increase the rate at which the water in the body is replaced with new water.

Alcohol 
The removal of ethanol (drinking alcohol) through oxidation by alcohol dehydrogenase in the liver from the human body is limited. Hence the removal of a large concentration of alcohol from blood may follow zero-order kinetics. Also the rate-limiting steps for one substance may be in common with other substances. For instance, the blood alcohol concentration can be used to modify the biochemistry of methanol and ethylene glycol. In this way the oxidation of methanol to the toxic formaldehyde and formic acid in the human body can be prevented by giving an appropriate amount of ethanol to a person who has ingested methanol. Note that methanol is very toxic and causes blindness and death. A person who has ingested ethylene glycol can be treated in the same way. Half life is also relative to the subjective metabolic rate of the individual in question.

Common prescription medications

Metals 
The biological half-life of caesium in humans is between one and four months. This can be shortened by feeding the person prussian blue. The prussian blue in the digestive system acts as a solid ion exchanger which absorbs the caesium while releasing potassium ions.

For some substances, it is important to think of the human or animal body as being made up of several parts, each with their own affinity for the substance, and each part with a different biological half-life (physiologically-based pharmacokinetic modelling). Attempts to remove a substance from the whole organism may have the effect of increasing the burden present in one part of the organism. For instance, if a person who is contaminated with lead is given EDTA in a chelation therapy, then while the rate at which lead is lost from the body will be increased, the lead within the body tends to relocate into the brain where it can do the most harm.
Polonium in the body has a biological half-life of about 30 to 50 days.
Caesium in the body has a biological half-life of about one to four months.
Mercury (as methylmercury) in the body has a half-life of about 65 days.
Lead in the blood has a half life of 28–36 days.
Lead in bone has a biological half-life of about ten years.
Cadmium in bone has a biological half-life of about 30 years.
Plutonium in bone has a biological half-life of about 100 years.
Plutonium in the liver has a biological half-life of about 40 years.

Peripheral half-life 
Some substances may have different half-lives in different parts of the body. For example, oxytocin has a half-life of typically about three minutes in the blood when given intravenously. Peripherally administered (e.g. intravenous) peptides like oxytocin cross the blood-brain-barrier very poorly, although very small amounts (< 1%) do appear to enter the central nervous system in humans when given via this route. In contrast to peripheral administration, when administered intranasally via a nasal spray, oxytocin reliably crosses the blood–brain barrier and exhibits psychoactive effects in humans. In addition, also unlike the case of peripheral administration, intranasal oxytocin has a central duration of at least 2.25 hours and as long as 4 hours. In likely relation to this fact, endogenous oxytocin concentrations in the brain have been found to be as much as 1000-fold higher than peripheral levels.

Rate equations

First-order elimination

Half-times apply to processes where the elimination rate is exponential. If  is the concentration of a substance at time , its time dependence is given by

where k is the reaction rate constant. Such a decay rate arises from a first-order reaction where the rate of elimination is proportional to the amount of the substance:

The half-life for this process is

Alternatively, half-life is given by

where λz is the slope of the terminal phase of the time–concentration curve for the substance on a semilogarithmic scale.

Half-life is determined by clearance (CL) and volume of distribution (VD) and the relationship is described by the following equation:

In clinical practice, this means that it takes 4 to 5 times the half-life for a drug's serum concentration to reach steady state after regular dosing is started, stopped, or the dose changed.  So, for example, digoxin has a half-life (or t½) of 24–36 h; this means that a change in the dose will take the best part of a week to take full effect. For this reason, drugs with a long half-life (e.g., amiodarone, elimination t½ of about 58 days) are usually started with a loading dose to achieve their desired clinical effect more quickly.

Biphasic half-life
Many drugs follow a biphasic elimination curve — first a steep slope then a shallow slope:
STEEP (initial) part of curve —> initial distribution of the drug in the body.
SHALLOW part of curve —> ultimate excretion of drug, which is dependent on the release of the drug from tissue compartments into the blood. 
The longer half-life is called the terminal half-life and the half-life of the largest component is called the dominant half-life. For a more detailed description see Pharmacokinetics § Multi-compartmental models.

Sample values and equations

See also
Half-life, pertaining to the general mathematical concept in physics or pharmacology.
Effective half-life

References

External links

Pharmacokinetics
Mathematics in medicine
Temporal exponentials